Olimpo León Cárdenas Moreira (1923 Vinces – Tuluá 1991) was an Ecuadorian singer.

Career
He toured Colombia a great deal, giving concerts in towns that had never had a performance in their short and long histories. Almost 50 years later he is remembered as the great and "famous" singer who sang boleros at a public performance in Villavicencio, in 1959.

References

1923 births
1991 deaths
People from Vinces Canton
20th-century Ecuadorian male singers
Ecuadorian expatriates in Colombia